Sterławki Średnie  is a village in the administrative district of Gmina Giżycko, within Giżycko County, Warmian-Masurian Voivodeship, in northern Poland.

The village did not exist before 1945. Translated it would be "Mittel Stürlack" or "Middle Średnie".

References

Villages in Giżycko County